Hong Kong, China sent a delegation to compete at the  2012 Summer Paralympics in London. The team was composed of 28 competitors.

Medallists

Multiple medallists

Athletics

Men

Women

Boccia

Mixed Individual

Mixed Pairs

Mixed Team

Equestrian

Shooting

Swimming

Men

Women

Table tennis

Men

Women

Wheelchair fencing

Men

Women

References

Nations at the 2012 Summer Paralympics
2012
2012 in Hong Kong sport